Norfolk County is located in the U.S. state of Massachusetts.  At the 2020 census, the population was 725,981. Its county seat is Dedham. It is the fourth most populous county in the United States whose county seat is neither a city nor a borough, and it is the second most populous county that has a county seat at a town. The county was named after the English county of the same name. Two towns, Cohasset and Brookline, are exclaves.

Norfolk County is included in the Boston-Cambridge-Newton, MA-NH Metropolitan Statistical Area.

Norfolk County is the 24th highest-income county in the United States with a median household income of $107,361. It is the wealthiest county in Massachusetts.

History
Norfolk County, Massachusetts was created on March 26, 1793, by legislation signed by Governor John Hancock. Most of the towns were originally part of Suffolk County, Massachusetts. The towns of Dorchester and Roxbury were part of Norfolk County when it was created but, as Boston annexed each town, they became part of Suffolk County again. Hingham and Hull were originally part of the Norfolk County legislation but petitioned to remain in Suffolk county and in June 1793 their removal to Norfolk county was repealed. In 1803, they were moved into Plymouth County, Massachusetts. 
Norfolk County is the birthplace of four Presidents of the United States (John Adams, John Quincy Adams, John F. Kennedy, and George H. W. Bush), resulting in the moniker "County of Presidents."

Sheriffs

There have been 21 sheriffs of Norfolk County.

Treasurers

Registers of Deeds

The Registry was originally housed in one of the first floor rooms of the home of Eliphalet Pond, the first registrar, at 963 Washington Street in Dedham. A sign was nailed to a tree out front informing the public of its location. It then moved to the original Norfolk County Courthouse and remained there for about three decades. When the new Norfolk County Courthouse was built in 1827, the middle office on the west side of the lower level was used by the Registry. When the population of the county grew and the number of real estate transactions increased apace, a new building was constructed for the Registry across the street at 649 High Street. The Boston firm Peabody & Stearns was hired to design the current Registry of Deeds, built in 1905. The main section of the building measures 52 feet by 186 feet, is two stories high with a copper hipped roof, and is built of Indiana limestone with details made of granite from Deer Isle, Maine.

Other
In the mid-1800s, Jonathan H. Cobb was the clerk of courts.

Geography
It is the third-smallest county in Massachusetts by total area. The county is not completely contiguous; the towns of Brookline and Cohasset are each part of Norfolk County but are separated from the majority of Norfolk County (and each other) by either water or other counties. At the county's formation, Hingham and Hull were to be part of it, but joined Plymouth County instead, leaving Cohasset as the initial exclave of Norfolk County and an enclave of Plymouth County. Brookline became the second exclave of Norfolk County in 1873 when the neighboring town of West Roxbury was annexed by Boston (thus leaving Norfolk County to join Suffolk County) and Brookline refused to be annexed by Boston after the Brookline-Boston annexation debate of 1873.

Adjacent counties
Middlesex County (northwest)
Suffolk County (north)
Plymouth County (southeast)
Bristol County (south)
Providence County, Rhode Island (southwest)
Worcester County (west)

National protected areas
 Adams National Historical Park
 Boston Harbor Islands National Recreation Area (part)
 Frederick Law Olmsted National Historic Site
 John Fitzgerald Kennedy National Historic Site

Major highways

Demographics

2000 census
At the 2000 census there were 650,308 people, 248,827 households, and 165,967 families residing in the county. The racial makeup of the county was 89.02% White or European American, 3.18% Black or African American, 0.13% Native American, 5.50% Asian, 0.02% Pacific Islander, 0.78% from other races, and 1.37% from two or more races.  1.84%. were Hispanic or Latino of any race. 28.6% were of Irish, 13.4% Italian, 7.7% English and 5.0% descendants of colonists ancestry according to Census 2000. 85.7% spoke English, 2.3% Chinese in any dialect, 2.0% Spanish, 1.0% Italian and 1.0% French as their first language.

Of the 248,827 households 31.20% had children under the age of 18 living with them, 54.20% were married couples living together, 9.50% had a female householder with no husband present, and 33.30% were non-families. 26.80% of households were one person and 10.80% were one person aged 65 or older.  The average household size was 2.54 and the average family size was 3.14.

The age distribution was 23.40% under the age of 18, 7.00% from 18 to 24, 31.60% from 25 to 44, 23.50% from 45 to 64, and 14.40% 65 or older.  The median age was 38 years. For every 100 females, there were 91.40 males.  For every 100 females age 18 and over, there were 87.60 males.

The median household income was $63,432 and the median family income was $77,847 (these figures had risen to $77,294 and $95,243 respectively as of a 2007 estimate). Males had a median income of $51,301 versus $37,108 for females. The per capita income for the county was $32,484.  About 2.90% of families and 4.60% of the population were below the poverty line, including 4.40% of those under age 18 and 5.70% of those age 65 or over.

2010 census
As of the 2010 United States census, there were 670,850 people, 257,914 households, and 168,903 families residing in the county. The racial makeup of the county was 82.3% white, 8.6% Asian, 5.7% black or African American, 0.2% American Indian, 1.3% from other races, and 1.9% from two or more races. Those of Hispanic or Latino origin made up 3.3% of the population. The largest ancestry groups were:

 31.8% Irish
 15.5% Italian
 11.0% English
 7.0% German
 4.6% French
 4.3% Chinese
 4.1% Polish
 3.2% Russian 
 3.1% American
 2.8% Scottish
 2.6% French Canadian
 2.4% Scotch-Irish
 2.0% West Indian
 2.0% Sub-Saharan African
 1.9% Portuguese
 1.8% Swedish
 1.6% Indian
 1.4% Arab
 1.4% Greek
 1.2% Canadian
 1.1% Vietnamese
 1.1% Lithuanian

Of the 257,914 households, 32.2% had children under the age of 18 living with them, 52.0% were married couples living together, 10.1% had a female householder with no husband present, 34.5% were non-families, and 27.6% of households were made up of individuals. The average household size was 2.53 and the average family size was 3.15. The median age was 40.7 years.

The median income for a household in the county was $81,027 and the median family income was $101,870. Males had a median income of $68,070 versus $51,870 for females. The per capita income for the county was $42,371. About 4.1% of families and 6.2% of the population were below the poverty line, including 6.3% of those under age 18 and 6.9% of those age 65 or over.

Demographic breakdown by town

Income

The ranking of unincorporated communities that are included on the list are reflective if the census-designated locations and villages were included as cities or towns. Data is from the 2007–2011 American Community Survey 5-Year Estimates.

Religion 

*congregations

**adherents

Government
The county has offices in Dedham Square. It runs the Norfolk County Correctional Center, the Norfolk County Registry of Deeds, and the Norfolk County Courthouse.

Current elected officials
All eligible voters of Norfolk County vote for three County Commissioners, a District Attorney, a Clerk of Courts, a Register of Deeds, a Sheriff, a County Treasurer, and a Register of Probate.

County Commissioners are elected for a four-year term; two Commissioners are elected to coincide with presidential elections, and one Commissioner is elected during the midterm elections. All three Commissioners must hail from a different municipality. The District Attorney is elected every four years coinciding with the midterm elections. The Clerk of Courts and Register of Deeds are elected every six years coinciding with the elections of Class I US Senators. The County Treasurer and Register of Probate are elected every six years coinciding with the elections of Class II US Senators. The Sheriff is elected every six years coinciding with the elections of Class III US Senators.

Politics

Like the rest of Massachusetts, Norfolk County is a Democratic stronghold. The last time it voted for a Republican presidential candidate was in 1984, during Ronald Reagan's landslide victory in which he carried every state except Minnesota and the district of Washington, D.C.

|}

Communities

Cities
Braintree
Franklin
Quincy
Randolph
Weymouth

Towns

Avon
Bellingham
Brookline
Canton
Cohasset
Dedham (traditional county seat)
Dover
Foxborough
Holbrook
Medfield
Medway
Millis
Milton
Needham
Norfolk
Norwood
Plainville
Sharon
Stoughton
Walpole
Wellesley
Westwood
Wrentham

Note: West Roxbury (annexed to Boston 1874), Roxbury (annexed to Boston 1868), Dorchester (founded 1630, annexed to Boston 1870), Hyde Park (incorporated 1868 from Dorchester, Milton, and Dedham, annexed to Boston 1912), and Hingham and Hull were originally part of Norfolk County when the county was incorporated in 1793.  As of August 2012, Hingham's Precinct 2 will be part of the Fourth Norfolk District.

Census-designated places

Bellingham
Dover
Foxborough
Medfield
Millis-Clicquot
Sharon
Walpole

Education
School districts include:

K-12:

 Avon School District
 Bellingham School District
 Braintree School District
 Brookline School District
 Canton School District
 Cohasset School District
 Dedham School District
 Foxborough School District
 Franklin School District
 Holbrook School District
 Medfield School District
 Medway School District
 Millis School District
 Milton School District
 Needham School District
 Norwood School District
 Quincy School District
 Randolph School District
 Sharon School District
 Stoughton School District
 Walpole School District
 Wellesley School District
 Westwood School District
 Weymouth School District

Secondary:
 Dover-Sherborn School District
 King Philip School District

Elementary:
 Dover School District
 Norfolk School District
 Plainville School District
 Wrentham School District

See also

 List of Massachusetts locations by per capita income
 Norfolk County Registry of Deeds
 National Register of Historic Places listings in Norfolk County, Massachusetts

Notes

References

Works cited

Bibliography

History of Norfolk County, Massachusetts With Biographical Sketches of Many of Its Pioneers and Prominent Men, by Duane Hamilton Hurd. Published by J.W. Lewis & Co., 1884. 1001 pages.
History of Norfolk County, Massachusetts, 1622-1918 by Louis Atwood Cook. Published by The S.J. Clarke publishing company, 1918. Volume 1.

External links
 
 
 Norfolk County official site
 Map of cities and towns of Massachusetts

 
Massachusetts counties
Counties in Greater Boston
1793 establishments in Massachusetts
Populated places established in 1793